Muhammad Al-Hafiz bin Harun (born 13 September 1994) is a Malaysian footballer who plays as a winger for Malaysia Super League club Kedah Darul Aman.

International career
On 23 September 2021, Al-Hafiz received his first call-up to the Malaysia national team, for central training and friendly matches against Jordan and Uzbekistan.

Career statistics

Club

Honours

Club
Penang
 Malaysia Premier League: 2020

References

External links
 

1994 births
Penang F.C. players
People from Kedah
Living people
Malaysian people of Malay descent
Association football wingers
Malaysia Super League players
Malaysia Premier League players
Malaysian footballers